This is a list of articles that are lists of monuments and memorials.

Africa

Kenya
  List of sites and monuments in Kenya

Morocco
  List of sites and monuments in Morocco

Sierra Leone
  List of National Monuments of Sierra Leone

Swaziland
  List of National Monuments of Swaziland

Uganda
  List of National Cultural Sites in Northern Region, Uganda

Americas

Argentina
  List of National Historic Monuments of Argentina

Canada
 List of Canadian war memorials
 List of royal monuments in Canada

Chile
  List of National Monuments of Chile
  List of National Monuments of Chile in Aysén Region

Colombia
  National Monuments of Colombia
  List of National Monuments of Colombia

Sint Maarten
  List of Designated Monuments in Sint Maarten

United States

  List of National Monuments of the United States
 List of national memorials of the United States
  List of equestrian statues in the United States
  List of monuments at the United States Military Academy
  List of memorials and monuments at Arlington National Cemetery
  List of memorials to the Grand Army of the Republic
  List of monuments of the Gettysburg Battlefield
  List of Union Civil War monuments and memorials
  List of Confederate monuments and memorials
  Removal of Confederate monuments and memorials
  List of American Civil War monuments in Kentucky
  Civil War Monuments in Washington, D.C.
  Monument Avenue
  Los Angeles Historic-Cultural Monument

Antarctica
  Historic Sites and Monuments in Antarctica

Asia

Azerbaijan
  List of monuments of Azerbaijan

People's Republic of China
  Chairman Mao statues
  Declared monuments of Hong Kong

Republic of China
  Chiang Kai-shek statues

India

By type 

 Archaeological sites in India
 Archaeoastronomical sites
 Ashoka pillars
 Bhimbetka
 Cave temples
 Cave paintings
 Colossal in situ sculptures
 Dolmens
 Forts
 Havelis
 IVC sites
 Menhirs
 Museums
 Rrock-cut temples
 Stepwell
 Statues:
 List of famous statues in India
 List of the tallest statues in India
 List of equestrian statues in India
 War memorials:
 National War Memorial (India)
 National Military Memorial
 National Police Memorial (India) 
 National War Memorial Southern Command 
 Amar Jawan Jyoti 
 India Gate
 Kargil War Memorial

National level 

 List of World Heritage Sites in India 
 Lists of Indian Monuments of National Importance
 List of State Protected Monuments in India
 Geological heritage sites

By state and cities 

  List of Monuments of National Importance in Agra circle
  List of Monuments of National Importance in Ahmedabad district
  List of Monuments of National Importance in Andhra Pradesh
  List of state protected Monuments in Andhra Pradesh
  List of State Protected Monuments in Arunachal Pradesh
  List of Monuments of National Importance in Assam
  List of State Protected Monuments in Assam
  List of Monuments of National Importance in Aurangabad circle
  List of Monuments of National Importance in Bangalore circle
  List of Monuments of National Importance in Bijapur district
  List of Monuments of National Importance in Belgaum district
  List of Monuments of National Importance in Bidar district
  List of Monuments of National Importance in Bihar
  List of State Protected Monuments in Bihar
  List of Monuments of National Importance in Chennai circle
  List of Monuments of National Importance in Chhattisgarh
  List of State Protected Monuments in Chhattisgarh
  List of Monuments of National Importance in Daman and Diu
  List of Monuments of National Importance in Delhi
  List of State Protected Monuments in Delhi
  List of Monuments of National Importance in Dharwad district
  List of Monuments in Dhawalagiri Zone
  List of Monuments of National Importance in Goa
  List of State Protected Monuments in Goa
  List of Monuments of National Importance in Gujarat
  List of State Protected Monuments in Gujarat
  List of Monuments of National Importance in Gulbarga district
  List of Monuments of National Importance in Haryana
  List of State Protected Monuments in Haryana
  List of Monuments of National Importance in Himachal Pradesh
  List of State Protected Monuments in Himachal Pradesh
  List of Monuments of National Importance in Jharkhand
  List of State Protected Monuments in Jharkhand
  List of Monuments of National Importance in Kanchipuram district
  List of Monuments of National Importance in Karnataka
  List of State Protected Monuments in Karnataka
  List of Monuments of National Importance in Jammu and Kashmir
  List of State Protected Monuments in Jammu and Kashmir
  List of Monuments of National Importance in Kerala
  List of Monuments of National Importance in Lucknow circle
  List of Monuments of National Importance in Lucknow circle/North
  List of Monuments of National Importance in Lucknow circle/South
  List of Monuments of National Importance in Madhya Pradesh
  List of State Protected Monuments in Madhya Pradesh
  List of Monuments of National Importance in Madhya Pradesh/East
  List of Monuments of National Importance in Madhya Pradesh/West
  List of Monuments of National Importance in Maharashtra
  List of State Protected Monuments in Maharashtra
  List of Monuments of National Importance in Manipur
  List of State Protected Monuments in Manipur
  List of Monuments of National Importance in Meghalaya
  List of State Protected Monuments in Meghalaya
  List of state protected monuments in Mizoram
  List of Monuments of National Importance in Mumbai circle
  List of Monuments of National Importance in Nagaland
  List of State Protected Monuments in Nagaland
  List of Monuments of National Importance in North Kanara district
  List of Monuments of National Importance in Odisha
  List of State Protected Monuments in Odisha
  List of Monuments of National Importance in Puducherry
  List of Monuments of National Importance in Pudukkottai district
  List of State Protected Monuments in Punjab, India
  List of Monuments of National Importance in Punjab, India
  List of Monuments of National Importance in Raichur district
  List of Monuments of National Importance in Rajasthan
  List of State Protected Monuments in Rajasthan
  List of Monuments of National Importance in Tamil Nadu
  List of State Protected Monuments in Tamil Nadu
  List of Monuments of National Importance in Telangana
  List of Monuments of National Importance in Thrissur circle
  List of Monuments of National Importance in Tripura
  List of State Protected Monuments in Tripura
  List of Monuments of National Importance in Sikkim
  List of State Protected Monuments in Sikkim
  List of Monuments of National Importance in Patna circle in Uttar Pradesh
  List of State Protected Monuments in Uttar Pradesh
  List of Monuments of National Importance in Uttarakhand
  List of State Protected Monuments in Uttarakhand
  List of Monuments of National Importance in West Bengal
  List of State Protected Monuments in West Bengal

Israel
 List of memorials and monuments at Mount Herzl

Japan
  List of Natural Monuments of Japan (Nara)
  List of Registered Monuments (Japan)
  List of Natural Monuments of Japan (Hokkaidō)
  List of Natural Monuments of Japan (Okinawa)

Middle East
  List of monuments damaged by conflict in the Middle East during the 21st century

Nepal

  List of monuments in Nepal
  List of monuments in Achham, Nepal
  List of monuments in Arghakhanchi, Nepal
  List of monuments in Baglung, Nepal
  List of monuments in Bagmati Zone
  List of monuments in Baitadi, Nepal
  List of monuments in Bajura, Nepal
  List of monuments in Bajhang, Nepal
  List of monuments in Banke, Nepal
  List of monuments in Bara, Nepal
  List of monuments in Bhaktapur, Nepal
  List of monuments in Bheri Zone
  List of monuments in Bhojpur, Nepal
  List of monuments in Chitwan, Nepal
  List of monuments in Dadeldhura, Nepal
  List of monuments in Dailekh, Nepal
  List of monuments in Dang, Nepal
  List of monuments in Darchula, Nepal
  List of monuments in Dhanusha, Nepal
  List of monuments in Dolakha, Nepal
  List of monuments in Dolpa, Nepal
  List of monuments in Doti, Nepal
  List of monuments in Dhankuta, Nepal
  List of monuments in Gandaki Zone
  List of monuments in Gulmi, Nepal
  List of monuments in Gorkha, Nepal
  List of monuments in Humla, Nepal
  List of monuments in Jajarkot, Nepal
  List of monuments in Janakpur Zone
  List of monuments in Jhapa, Nepal
  List of monuments in Jumla, Nepal
  List of monuments in Kailali, Nepal
  List of monuments in Kanchanpur, Nepal
  List of monuments in Kapilvastu, Nepal
  List of monuments in Karnali Zone
  List of monuments in Kathmandu, Nepal
  List of monuments in Hanuman Dhoka, Kathmandu
  List of monuments in Budanilkantha, Nepal
  List of monuments in Chandragiri, Nepal
  List of monuments in Dakshinkali, Nepal
  List of monuments in Kirtipur, Nepal
  List of monuments in Kageshwari Manohara, Nepal
  List of monuments in Metropolis 1, Kathmandu
  List of monuments in Metropolis 2, Kathmandu
  List of monuments in Metropolis 4, Kathmandu
  List of monuments in Metropolis 5, Kathmandu
  List of monuments in Metropolis 6, Kathmandu
  List of monuments in Metropolis 7, Kathmandu
  List of monuments in Metropolis 10, Kathmandu
  List of monuments in Metropolis 11, Kathmandu
  List of monuments in Metropolis 12, Kathmandu
  List of monuments in Metropolis 13, Kathmandu
  List of monuments in Metropolis 14, Kathmandu
  List of monuments in Metropolis 15, Kathmandu
  List of monuments in Metropolis 16, Kathmandu
  List of monuments in Metropolis 17, Kathmandu
  List of monuments in Metropolis 18, Kathmandu
  List of monuments in Metropolis 19, Kathmandu
  List of monuments in Shankharapur, Nepal
  List of monuments in Tarakeshwar, Nepal
  List of monuments in Tokha, Nepal
  List of monuments in Khotang, Nepal
  List of monuments in Kosi Zone
  List of monuments in Lalitpur, Nepal
  List of monuments in Lamjung, Nepal
  List of monuments in Ilam, Nepal
  List of monuments in Lumbini Zone
  List of monuments in Mahakali Zone
  List of monuments in Mahottari, Nepal
  List of monuments in Makwanpur, Nepal
  List of monuments in Manang, Nepal
  List of monuments in Mechi Zone
  List of monuments in Mugu, Nepal
  List of monuments in Mustang, Nepal
  List of monuments in Narayani Zone
  List of monuments in Nawalparasi, Nepal
  List of monuments in Nuwakot, Nepal
  List of monuments in Okhaldhunga, Nepal
  List of monuments in Palpa, Nepal
  List of monuments in Panchthar, Nepal
  List of monuments in Parbat, Nepal
  List of monuments in Parsa, Nepal
  List of monuments in Pyuthan, Nepal
  List of monuments in Ramechhap, Nepal
  List of monuments in Rapti Zone
  List of monuments in Rasuwa, Nepal
  List of monuments in Rautahat, Nepal
  List of monuments in Rolpa, Nepal
  List of monuments in Rupandehi, Nepal
  List of monuments in Sagarmatha Zone
  List of monuments in Salyan, Nepal
  List of monuments in Sankhuwasabha, Nepal
  List of monuments in Saptari, Nepal
  List of monuments in Sarlahi, Nepal
  List of monuments in Seti Zone
  List of monuments in Sindhuli, Nepal
  List of monuments in Siraha, Nepal
  List of monuments in Solukhumbu, Nepal
  List of monuments in Sunsari, Nepal
  List of monuments in Surkhet, Nepal
  List of monuments in Syangja, Nepal
  List of monuments in Tanahun, Nepal
  List of monuments in Taplejung, Nepal
  List of monuments in Terhathum, Nepal
  List of monuments in Udayapur, Nepal

North Korea
  Natural monuments of North Korea

Pakistan
  Cultural heritage in Pakistan (redirect from List of monuments in Pakistan)
  List of national monuments of Pakistan

Singapore
 List of national monuments of Singapore

South Korea
  Natural monuments of South Korea

Turkey
  List of martyrs' monuments and memorials
  List of natural monuments of Turkey

Europe

Albania
  List of Religious Cultural Monuments of Albania

Bosnia and Herzegovina
  List of National Monuments of Bosnia and Herzegovina
  List of World War II monuments and memorials in Bosnia and Herzegovina
  People's Heroes of Yugoslavia monuments in Bosnia and Herzegovina

Croatia
 List of Yugoslav World War II monuments and memorials in Croatia

Denmark
 List of public art in Copenhagen

France
  List of equestrian statues in France
  List of historic sites in Metz, France
  List of historic monuments of 1840

Georgia
  List of monuments in Rustavi

Germany
  List of equestrian statues in Germany

Hungary
  List of equestrian statues in Hungary

Ireland

  National monuments of Ireland
  List of megalithic monuments in Ireland
  List of National Monuments in Connacht
  List of megalithic monuments in Cork
  List of National Monuments in County Carlow
  List of National Monuments in County Cavan
  List of National Monuments in County Clare
  List of National Monuments in County Cork
  List of National Monuments in County Donegal
  List of National Monuments in County Dublin
  List of National Monuments in County Galway
  List of National Monuments in County Kerry
  List of National Monuments in County Kildare
  List of National Monuments in County Kilkenny
  List of National Monuments in County Laois
  List of National Monuments in County Leitrim
  List of National Monuments in County Limerick
  List of National Monuments in County Longford
  List of National Monuments in County Louth
  List of National Monuments in County Mayo
  List of National Monuments in County Monaghan
  List of National Monuments in County Offaly
  List of National Monuments in County Roscommon
  List of National Monuments in County Sligo
  List of National Monuments in County Tipperary
  List of National Monuments in County Waterford
  List of National Monuments in County Westmeath
  List of National Monuments in County Wexford
  List of National Monuments in County Wicklow
  List of National Monuments in Leinster
  List of National Monuments in Munster
  Scheduled Monuments in Powys
  List of National Monuments in Ulster

Italy
  Monuments of Italy
  List of equestrian statues in Italy
  List of buildings and structures in Como
  List of ancient monuments in Rome  
  List of monuments of the Roman Forum
  List of obelisks in Rome & Statues and monuments of patriots on the Janiculum

Kosovo
  List of monuments in Prizren

Lithuania
  List of public art in Vilnius

Malta

  List of monuments in Malta
  List of monuments in Attard
  List of monuments in Balzan
  List of monuments in Birgu
  List of monuments in Birkirkara
  List of monuments in Birżebbuġa
  List of monuments in Cospicua
  List of monuments in Dingli
  List of monuments in Fgura
  List of monuments in Floriana
  List of monuments in Fontana, Gozo
  List of monuments in Għajnsielem
  List of monuments in Għarb
  List of monuments in Għasri
  List of monuments in Għaxaq
  List of monuments in Gudja
  List of monuments in Gżira
  List of monuments in Iklin
  List of monuments in Kalkara
  List of monuments in Kerċem
  List of monuments in Kirkop
  List of monuments in Lija
  List of monuments in Luqa
  List of monuments in Marsa, Malta
  List of monuments in Marsaskala
  List of monuments in Marsaxlokk
  List of monuments in Mdina
  List of monuments in Mġarr
  List of monuments in Mosta
  List of monuments in Mqabba
  List of monuments in Msida
  List of monuments in Mtarfa
  List of monuments in Munxar
  List of monuments in Nadur
  List of monuments in Naxxar
  List of monuments in Paola, Malta
  List of monuments in Pembroke, Malta
  List of monuments in Pietà, Malta
  List of monuments in Qala, Malta
  List of monuments in Qormi
  List of monuments in Qrendi
  List of monuments in Rabat, Malta
  List of monuments in Safi, Malta
  List of monuments in San Ġwann
  List of monuments in San Lawrenz
  List of monuments in Sannat
  List of monuments in Santa Venera
  List of monuments in Senglea
  List of monuments in Siġġiewi
  List of monuments in Sliema
  List of monuments in St. Julian's
  List of monuments in Tarxien
  List of monuments in Valletta
  List of monuments in Victoria, Gozo
  List of monuments in Xagħra
  List of monuments in Xewkija
  List of monuments in Żabbar
  List of monuments in Żebbuġ
  List of monuments in Żebbuġ, Gozo
  List of monuments in Żejtun
  List of monuments in Żurrieq

Montenegro
 List of Yugoslav World War II monuments and memorials in Montenegro

North Macedonia
 List of World War II monuments and memorials in North Macedonia
 List of People's Heroes of Yugoslavia monuments in North Macedonia

Poland
  List of Historic Monuments (Poland)
  List of equestrian statues in Poland

Portugal
  List of national monuments of Portugal

Romania
  List of historic monuments in Romania
  National Register of Historic Monuments in Romania
  List of monuments in Chișinău

Russia
  List of equestrian statues in Russia
  List of monuments of Tolyatti

Serbia
  Cultural Monuments of Exceptional Importance (Serbia)
  List of People's Heroes of Yugoslavia monuments in Serbia
  People's Heroes of Yugoslavia monuments in Serbia
  List of World War II monuments and memorials in Serbia

Slovakia
  List of cultural monuments in Lučenec
  List of cultural monuments in Rimavská Sobota

Slovenia

 List of World War II monuments and memorials in Slovenia
 List of People's Heroes of Yugoslavia monuments in Slovenia

Spain
  List of equestrian statues in Spain
  List of missing landmarks in Spain

Sweden
  List of sites and monuments in Sweden

Switzerland

 Swiss Inventory of Cultural Property of National and Regional Significance
 Aargau
 Appenzell Ausserrhoden
 Appenzell Innerrhoden
 Basel-Landschaft
 Basel-Stadt
 Bern (A-M, N-Z)
 Fribourg
 Geneva
 Glarus
 Graubünden
 Jura
 Lucerne
 Neuchâtel
 Nidwalden
 Obwalden
 Schaffhausen
 Schwyz
 Solothurn
 St. Gallen
 Thurgau
 Ticino
 Uri
 Valais
 Vaud
 Zug
 Zürich

Ukraine
 List of communist monuments in Ukraine
 Demolition of monuments to Vladimir Lenin in Ukraine

United Kingdom

  List of scheduled monuments
  List of equestrian statues in the United Kingdom
  Scheduled monuments in Bath and North East Somerset
  List of Scheduled Monuments in Blaenau Gwent
  Scheduled monuments in Birmingham
  List of Scheduled Monuments in Bridgend
  List of Scheduled Monuments in Caerphilly
  List of Scheduled Monuments in Cardiff
  Scheduled Monuments in Carmarthenshire
  Scheduled Monuments in Ceredigion
  Lists of scheduled monuments in Cheshire
  List of scheduled monuments in Cheshire dated to before 1066
  List of scheduled monuments in Cheshire (1066–1539)
  List of scheduled monuments in Cheshire since 1539
  Scheduled monuments in Cornwall
  Scheduled monuments in Coventry
  Scheduled monuments and listed buildings in Exeter
  Scheduled Monuments in Gwynedd
  Scheduled monuments in Leicester
  Scheduled monuments in Greater Manchester
  Scheduled monuments in Maidstone
  Scheduled monuments in Mendip
  List of Scheduled Monuments in Merthyr Tydfil County Borough
  List of Scheduled Monuments in Monmouthshire
  List of Scheduled Monuments in Newport
  List of scheduled monuments in North Somerset
  Scheduled Monuments in Pembrokeshire
  List of Scheduled prehistoric Monuments in north Pembrokeshire
  List of Scheduled Monuments in Rhondda Cynon Taf
  List of scheduled monuments in Sedgemoor
  List of scheduled monuments in South Somerset
  Scheduled monuments in Somerset
  List of Scheduled Monuments in Swansea
  List of scheduled monuments in Taunton Deane
  List of Scheduled Monuments in Torfaen
  List of Scheduled Monuments in Vale of Glamorgan
  Lists of scheduled monuments in Wales
  Scheduled monuments in the West Midlands
  Scheduled monuments in West Somerset

Oceania

Australia
  Monuments of Australia

Former states

Yugoslavia
  List of People's Heroes of Yugoslavia monuments
  People's Heroes of Yugoslavia monuments
  Yugoslav World War II monuments and memorials
  List of Yugoslav World War II monuments and memorials

Specific events
  List of Armenian Genocide memorials
 List of Holocaust memorials and museums

Specific people

  List of memorials to John Adams
  List of things named for Henry Clay
  List of monuments and memorials to Christopher Columbus
  List of memorials to Jefferson Davis
  List of memorials to Dwight D. Eisenhower
  Memorials to Warren G. Harding
  List of memorials to William Henry Harrison
  List of monuments and memorials to Sam Houston
  List of memorials to Andrew Jackson
  List of monuments of Pope John Paul II
  List of memorials to Lyndon B. Johnson
  List of memorials to John F. Kennedy
  List of memorials to Robert E. Lee
  List of statues of Vladimir Lenin
  Memorials to Abraham Lincoln
  List of memorials to James Madison
  List of memorials to James Monroe
  List of memorials to Franklin D. Roosevelt
  Memorials to Theodore Roosevelt
  List of statues of Stalin
  List of memorials to Martin Van Buren
  List of statues of Queen Victoria
  List of memorials to George Washington
  List of monuments to Arthur Wellesley, 1st Duke of Wellington
  List of memorials to Woodrow Wilson

See also
  List of heritage registers
  List of Monuments, Fine Arts, and Archives (MFAA) personnel
  List of equestrian statues by country
  List of monuments depicting pigeons